BNS Durbar  is a Type 024 missile boat of Bangladesh Navy. The ship served Bangladesh Navy from 1983 to 2017.

Career
BNS Durbar was commissioned on 6 April 1983. In the cyclone of 1991, the ship was damaged and later on repaired. In '"Exercise Sea Thunder 2014", Durbar fired SY-1 missile. She was decommissioned from the Bangladesh Navy on 30 March 2017. Later on she was scrapped.

Design
The ship carries two SY-1 anti-ship missiles. Besides, it also carries two Type 61 25 mm guns. For surface search, it has a Type 352 Square Tie Radar.

References

Ships of the Bangladesh Navy
Missile boats of the Bangladesh Navy